Meridian-Baseline State Park is a historic preservation area covering  in Ingham County and Jackson County,  Michigan, containing the intersection of the Michigan meridian and the baseline used for the Michigan Survey. The state park has two monuments that show where the two mismatched baselines meet the principal meridian at the North Initial Point and South Initial Point.

History

Efforts to acquire the site were initiated by state and private interests in the 1960s. In the 1960s and 1970s, land was acquired and money was raised toward establishing a Museum of Surveying on the site. Those efforts were abandoned when the Michigan Society of Professional Surveyors opened a museum in Lansing, Michigan, in 1981.

Although the site was landlocked for many years, in 2014, the Michigan Department of Natural Resources acquired additional property allowing public access from Meridian Road near the Jackson–Ingham county line. Improvements made at the site included trail clearing and construction of a 10-car parking lot. After road signs, trail markers, and a bridge over the creek were added, the State of Michigan in conjunction with Ingham and Jackson counties, opened the new access to the park on October 12, 2015. In 2016, an additional boardwalk was completed in the wetlands near the markers.

References

External links

Meridian-Baseline State Park Michigan Department of Natural Resources 
Meridian-Baseline State Park Map Michigan Department of Natural Resources 
Meridian-Baseline State Park Topo Map Michigan Department of Natural Resources 

State parks of Michigan
Protected areas of Ingham County, Michigan
Protected areas of Jackson County, Michigan
Protected areas established in 1967
1967 establishments in Michigan
IUCN Category III